Westhorpe House is a  Grade II listed building near Little Marlow which is believed to have once been the home of Field marshal Sir George Nugent.

History
The house was built for James Chase MP in the classical style in about 1700. It became the home of Dr. Isaac Maddox, Bishop of Worcester, and then of Everard Fawkener, Postmaster General, and later of Alexander Wynch, Governor of Madras, during the 18th century. It was bought by Field marshal Sir George Nugent in October 1809. It passed to George Jackson, a landowner, in 1863 and later to Major Herbert Gordon, an officer in the 93rd Highlanders, who was still living there in 1925.

It is possible that the house was used as a prisoner of war camp during World War II.

It was the UK head office of Lexmark who vacated the house in 2004.

In March 2014 it was still being marketed as a potential company head office.

References

Country houses in Buckinghamshire